Derek Leask (born 1948) is a New Zealand diplomat. From March 2008 to February 2013, he was the High Commissioner from New Zealand to the United Kingdom, and concurrently accredited as Ambassador to Ireland and High Commissioner to Nigeria. Leask is a career diplomat, who joined the Ministry of Foreign Affairs in 1969. Before becoming Commissioner, he was Deputy Secretary at the Ministry of Foreign Affairs and Trade in Wellington. He served as Ambassador to the European Union in Brussels from 1994 to 1999, and was earlier posted to Suva, Ottawa and London, between 1985 and 1989.

Leask was born in Wellington, and has degrees from Victoria University of Wellington (BCA), and the University of Canterbury (MComm, Hons-Economics).

High Commissioner to the United Kingdom
Minister of Foreign Affairs Winston Peters announced Leask would be the next High Commissioner in London on 22 November 2007, succeeding Jonathan Hunt. As High Commissioner, Leask attended the service for Edmund Hillary at St George's Chapel in Windsor Castle on 2 April 2008.

Enquiry and vindication

Starting in 2012, Leask was connected to the leaking of documents from Ministry of Foreign Affairs and Trade. An inquiry led by Paula Rebstock was later found to be "flawed" in its dealings with Leask by an Ombudsman's report by Ron Paterson, which recommended Leask be paid legal costs and compensation.

References

External links
 New Zealand High Commission website

1948 births
Living people
People from Wellington City
University of Canterbury alumni
Victoria University of Wellington alumni
High Commissioners of New Zealand to the United Kingdom
Ambassadors of New Zealand to the European Union
Ambassadors of New Zealand to Ireland
High Commissioners of New Zealand to Nigeria